Events in the year 1992 in Ukraine.

Incumbents 

 President: Leonid Kravchuk
 Prime Minister: Vitold Fokin (until 2 October), Valentyn Symonenko (from 2 October until 13 October), Leonid Kuchma (from 13 October)

Events 

 28 January – The blue and yellow flag of Ukraine was officially restored by the Verkhovna Rada.

Deaths

References 

 
Ukraine
Ukraine
1990s in Ukraine
Years of the 20th century in Ukraine